The Senate Armed Services Subcommittee on Emerging Threats and Capabilities is one of seven subcommittees within the Senate Armed Services Committee.

Jurisdiction

The Emerging Threats and Capabilities subcommittee has jurisdiction over Department of Defense policies and programs to counter emerging threats (such as proliferation of weapons of mass destruction, terrorism, illegal drugs, and other threats), information warfare and special operations programs, the Defense Threat Reduction Agency, and Department of Energy non-proliferation programs.  The subcommittee also oversees sales of U.S. military technology to foreign countries, and defense and military research and development efforts through the Defense Advanced Research Projects Agency.

Members, 118th Congress

Historical subcommittee rosters

117th Congress

116th Congress

115th Congress

See also
 U.S. House Armed Services Subcommittee on Emerging Threats and Capabilities

External links
Senate Armed Services Committee home page
Senate Armed Services Committee subcommittee list and membership page

Armed Services Senate Emerging Threats and Capabilities